South Park High School may refer to:

South Park High School (Colorado)
South Park High School (Buffalo, New York)
South Park High School (South Park, Pennsylvania)
South Park High School (Beaumont, Texas)